Hypochniciellum is a genus of corticioid fungi in the family Amylocorticiaceae. Species in the genus have white to cream-colored, resupinate fruit bodies (growing flat, like a crust). The hypha have clamp connections. The spores are roughly elliptical, yellowish, and smooth.

References

External links

Amylocorticiales